Serra Pedace is a frazione of the comune of Casali del Manco in the province of Cosenza, Calabria, southern Italy. It lost its comune status in 2017 after a referendum,  along with four other municipalities.

References

 

Cities and towns in Calabria